X17 may refer to:

Jaguar C-X17, concept SUV unveiled by Jaguar Cars at the 2013 Frankfurt Motor Show
Lockheed X-17, three stage solid-fuel research rocket to test the effects of high mach atmospheric re-entry
X17 (New York City bus), a bus route in New York
X17 particle, a hypothetical sub-atomic particle causing anomalous measurement results at 17MeV.